Jin Youzhi (21 September 1918 – 10 April 2015), born Aisin-Gioro Puren, was a Chinese politician and historian. He was the head of the House of Aisin-Gioro, the ruling clan of the Qing dynasty, from 1994 until his death in 2015. He was the fourth and youngest son of Prince Chun, and a younger half-brother of Puyi, the last emperor of China. Instead of using his Manchu clan name "Aisin-Gioro" as his family name, Puren adopted "Jin" as his new family name. "Jin" means "gold" in Mandarin, as does "Aisin" in the Manchu language. His courtesy name was "Youzhi." He is best known as "Jin Youzhi." The Chinese media referred to him as "the last emperor's younger brother" or "the last imperial younger brother."

Life
Jin was born in the Prince Chun Mansion in Shichahai, Beijing. After receiving an early education in Chinese classics and traditional art, he established a public primary school in the Prince Chun Mansion in 1947 with support from his father. He was the principal of the school while his sister was a teacher there. The school was later donated to the Chinese government, after which Jin continued working as a teacher until retiring in 1988. In his retirement, Jin wrote books on the history of the Qing dynasty and literature. He served three terms as a delegate to the Municipal Political Consultative Conference of Beijing, and was also a researcher in Chinese history at the Beijing Research Institute.

Jin was the heir to the Manchu throne under a 1937 succession law issued by Puyi as emperor of Manchukuo.

Family 
 First wife, of the Jin clan (d. 1971), personal name Yuting
 Yuzhang (b. May 1942), first son
 Jin Yuquan (b. 1946), second son
 First daughter, personal name Yukun
 Married Mr. Du, and had issue (one son)
 Second daughter, personal name Yucheng
 Married Mr. Qiao, and had issue (one son)
 Jin Yulan (b. December 1948), third son

 Second wife, of the Zhang clan, personal name Maoying

Ancestry

See also
 Royal and noble ranks of the Qing dynasty
 Ranks of imperial consorts in China § Qing

References

1918 births
2015 deaths
Aisin Gioro
Manchu politicians
People's Republic of China politicians from Beijing
Qing dynasty imperial princes
Prince Chun (醇)
Educators from Beijing
People's Republic of China historians
Historians from Beijing
Yaohua High School alumni
Burials at Babaoshan Revolutionary Cemetery